Jeffrey Brandt Foss (born December 12, 1988) is an American former professional ice hockey defenseman. He most notably played with the Milwaukee Admirals in the American Hockey League (AHL) and KalPa in the Finnish Liiga. Foss was selected by the Nashville Predators in the 6th round (166th overall) of the 2008 NHL Entry Draft.

Foss made his Liiga debut playing with KalPa during the 2013–14 Liiga season. He registered 2 assists in 58 games from the blueline with KalPa before opting to end his three year professional career.

Career statistics

Awards and honors

References

External links

1988 births
Living people
American men's ice hockey defensemen
Cincinnati Cyclones (ECHL) players
KalPa players
Milwaukee Admirals players
Nashville Predators draft picks
Sioux Falls Stampede players
RPI Engineers men's ice hockey players